José Antonio de la Guerra y Noriega (March 6, 1779 – February 18, 1858) was a Californio military officer, ranchero, and founder of the prominent Guerra family of California. He served as the Commandant of the Presidio of Santa Barbara and the Presidio of San Diego.

Biography
José de la Guerra was born 1779 at Novales, Cantabria, Spain.  As a boy he wished to be a war leader .  When he was 13 De La Guerra went to Mexico City in Colonial Mexico, New Spain, to live with his maternal uncle Pedro Gonzales de Noriega, a wealthy merchant.

De La Guerra joined the frontier army in 1793, working for the paymaster general.  He was appointed a cadet in 1798 at the Presidio of San Diego in Alta California. He was promoted to alférez (ensign) at the Presidio of Monterey in 1800, and was its acting Commandant in 1804.  In 1806 he was made lieutenant at the Presidio of Santa Barbara. From 1807 to 1815 he was lieutenant at the Presidio of San Diego, and was, for a short time during 1806–1807 the commandant.

From 1815, De La Guerra served at Santa Barbara, becoming captain in 1817. He became Commandant in 1827, succeeding José Darío Argüello, who was promoted to Governor of Alta California. De La Guerra also became a Deputy (diputado) to the Mexican National Congress in 1827. De La Guerra served as Commandant until 1842, when he retired after 52 years of service in the army. De La Guerra was a Californio popularly known as El Capitán.

From land grants and purchases, De La Guerra became owner of over 1/2 million acres (2000 km2) in present Santa Barbara, Ventura, Marin, and Sacramento counties, California. These include Rancho Simi, Rancho Las Posas, Rancho San Julian, Rancho Los Alamos and Rancho El Conejo.

De La Guerra married María Antonia Carrillo (January 8, 1786 - December 26, 1843), daughter of José Raimundo Carrillo, on May 16, 1804. They had seven sons (Jose Antonio, Juan, Francisco, Pablo, Joaquin, Miguel, and Antonio Maria) and four daughters (Teresa, Angustias, Anita, and María Antonia).

De La Guerra died in 1858 and is buried in the church crypt at Mission Santa Barbara with his wife. His house, called the Casa de la Guerra, still stands and is a historic landmark of downtown Santa Barbara.

See also
Casa de la Guerra
Pablo de la Guerra
Antonio Maria de la Guerra
Alfred Robinson - Anita de la Guerra de Noriega y Carrillo
Ranchos of California
List of Ranchos of California

Further reading
 Fr. Joseph A. Thompson. El Gran Capitan, José De la Guerra, (Franciscan Fathers of California, Cabrera & Sons, Los Angeles, 1961)
 De La Guerra Family Papers, Huntington Library, San Marino, California
 Narriative of daughter Teresa de La Guerra de Hartnell, 1875
 Dana, Richard Henry, Jr. "Two Years Before the Mast"

References

1779 births
1858 deaths
Californios
People of Alta California
Mexican California
People from Santa Barbara, California
Land owners from California
Military personnel from California
Military personnel from Cantabria
Spanish emigrants to Mexico
Santa Barbara, California